Catagonium complanatum is a species of moss from the genus Catagonium. It has discovered by Jules Cardot and Viktor Ferdinand Brotherus in 1925.   Before the name Catagonium complanatum, it had a basionym named Calliergonella complanata by Cardot & Broth.

References

Hypnales
Plants described in 1925
Taxa named by Jules Cardot
Taxa named by Viktor Ferdinand Brotherus